Coursing by humans is the pursuit of game or other animals by dogs—chiefly greyhounds and other sighthounds—catching their prey by speed, running by sight, but not by scent. Coursing was a common hunting technique, practised by the nobility, the landed and wealthy, as well as by commoners with sighthounds and lurchers. In its oldest recorded form in the Western world, as described by Arrian, it was a sport practised by all levels of society, which remained the case until Carolingian period forest law appropriated hunting grounds, or commons, for the king, the nobility, and other land owners. It then became a formalised competition, specifically on hare in Britain, practised under rules, the Laws of the Leash.

As a zoological term, it refers to predation by running down prey over long distances, as opposed to stalking, in which a stealthy approach is followed by a short burst of sprinting.

Sport and hunting 
Animals coursed in hunting and sport include hares, foxes, deer of all sorts, antelope, gazelle, jackals, wolves. Jackrabbits and coyotes are the most common animals coursed in the United States. Competitive coursing in Ireland, the UK (until prohibition in 2004), Portugal and Spain has two dogs running against each other. In the United States, generally speaking three dogs are run together.
  
The Protection of Wild Mammals (Scotland) Act and the Hunting Act 2004 (in England and Wales) made it illegal to hunt any type of mammal with dogs except rabbits and rats. Dogs are still permitted to chase (flush) game into the path of a waiting gun, as long as no more than two dogs are used.

In Australia, dogs may be used to hunt feral animals such as foxes, deer, goats, rabbits and pigs.

See also

Hare coursing
Greyhound racing
Lure coursing
Cheetah and Caracal – two feline species also historically used in similar hunting practices

References

Further reading

Blanning, Charles. The Greyhound and the Hare: A History of the Breed and the Sport. The National Coursing Club, 2018.
Blanning, Charles. Twenty Two Waterloo Cups 1981-2005. Charles Blanning, Fullerton Press in association with the National Coursing Club, 2022.
Cox, Harding Edward de Fonblanque. Coursing and falconry 1899 
Copold, Steve. Hounds Hares & Other Creatures: The Complete Book of Coursing 1977/1996
Dansey, William. Arrian On Coursing: the Cynegeticus London: J. Bohn, 1831 
Macpherson, H. A. The hare 1896   
Phillips A.A. & Willcock M.M. Xenophon & Arrian On Hunting with hounds 1999
Grant-Rennick. Coursing, The Pursuit of Game with Gazehounds 1976 
M. H. Salmon ("Dutch"). Gazehounds & Coursing: The History, Art, and Sport of Hunting with Sighthounds, Rev. and expanded 2nd ed. Silver City, N.M.: High-Lonesome Books, 1999. .
Stable, Owen QC, & Stuttard, R.M. A Review of Coursing British Field Sports Society, London 1971
Turbervile (Gascoigne), George. The Noble Art of Venerie or Hunting 1576. See page 246 "A short observation ... concerning coursing" 
Walsh, Edward G. Longdogs by Day 1990

Dog sports
Hunting methods